The Alley Cats is a 1966 American drama, comedy, cult film directed by Radley Metzger. The film stars Anne Arthur, Karen Field, Sabrina Koch, Charlie Hickman, Harald Baerow, and Uta Levka.

Plot
A liberated couple, engaged to be married, are each having affairs with women.

Cast 
 Anne Arthur as Leslie
 Karen Field as Agnes
 Sabrina Koch as Irena
 Charlie Hickman as Logan
 Harald Baerow as Christian
 Uta Levka as Sheila

Reception
According to film reviewer Gary Morris, The Alley Cats is a "typically artful, sexy, sometimes ponderous, ultimately satisfying softcore [film] effort".

Notes
According to one film reviewer, Radley Metzger's films, including those made during the Golden Age of Porn (1969–1984), are noted for their "lavish design, witty screenplays, and a penchant for the unusual camera angle". Another reviewer noted that his films were "highly artistic — and often cerebral ... and often featured gorgeous cinematography". Film and audio works by Metzger have been added to the permanent collection of the Museum of Modern Art (MoMA) in New York City.

References

External links
 The Alley Cats at  MUBI (related to The Criterion Collection)
 

 

American erotic drama films
Films directed by Radley Metzger
1966 films
1960s erotic drama films
1966 drama films
1960s English-language films
1960s American films